Vikram Verma (born 23 January 1944) is an Indian politician and a leader of  the Bharatiya Janata Party (BJP) from Dhar, Madhya Pradesh. He formerly served as a Member of Parliament (MP) in the Rajya Sabha. He also served as a Minister in the Government of India for Youth and Sports Affairs from 2002 to 2004.

Personal life 
Verma was born in the village Dharampuri of Dhar district in Madhya Pradesh.  His father is Ganpat Singh Verma. He married Neena Verma on 22 June 1978. Neena is a Member of the legislative assembly (MLA) from Dhar, Indore. They have three daughters. His eldest daughter is married to the elder son of Sahib Singh Verma, former Chief Minister of Delhi.

Education
Verma did his primary education in Dharampuri village. He graduated from Christian College, Indore. He received his M.A. (Hindi & Political Science) from Indore Christian College, Indore. He completed LL.B. from Indore Christian College, Indore.

Corruption allegations 
On 17 July 2015, Anand Rai, an Indian Right to Information (RTI) activist, lodged a complaint with the Central Bureau of Investigation (CBI) against Verma. He alleged that Verma had used his influence and power to get his MBBS student daughter transferred from a medical college in Uttar Pradesh to Gandhi Medical College in Bhopal, Madhya Pradesh. His daughter was also accused of getting admission to medical school with corruption.

Political career
He was president of the students' union in his college life.
1969-72 : he remained chairman of Dharampuri Municipality.
1977-80 : he was first time elected member of state assembly and appointed parliamentary secretary.
1980-85, Member, Legislative Assembly, Madhya Pradesh and was Pradesh mantri of Bhartiya Janta Party.
1989-93 Cabinet Minister, School Education, Higher Education, Sports, Culture, Government of Madhya Pradesh.
1990-93 and 1993-98 1978-80 Parliament Secretary, Education, Sports and Youth Welfare, Government of Madhya Pradesh
 1993-98 Leader of the Opposition, Legislative Assembly, Madhya Pradesh
 August 2002-04 Union Cabinet Minister of youth affairs and sports, Member of Rajya Sabha in Third Vajpayee Ministry
2006 Re-elected to Rajya Sabha
 2007- Appointed National Vice President of Bharatiya Janata Party

Awards
Verma won several awards in national level debates in Literature and participated in literary and socio-cultural activities.

References

Living people
Bharatiya Janata Party politicians from Madhya Pradesh
1944 births
Rajya Sabha members from Madhya Pradesh
People from Dhar
Madhya Pradesh MLAs 1977–1980
Madhya Pradesh MLAs 1980–1985
Madhya Pradesh MLAs 1990–1992
Madhya Pradesh MLAs 1993–1998
State cabinet ministers of Madhya Pradesh
Leaders of the Opposition in Madhya Pradesh